State Route 117 (SR 117) is an east–west highway in the western part of the U.S. state of Ohio.  Its western terminus is at State Route 118 near Rockford, and its eastern terminus is at U.S. Route 33 near Huntsville.  It goes through the towns of Spencerville and Lima, and comes close to Indian Lake.  East of Lima, the route takes a southeast to south-southeast heading to its eastern terminus.

History

State Route 117 was an original state highway that went from State Route 116 a few miles east of Spencerville to Bellefontaine, with the portion from Huntsville to Bellefontaine a concurrency with then State Route 32.  

In 1926, rerouting switched State Route 116 and State Route 198 so that the former would have a straighter heading.  State Route 198 was given State Route 116's former heading into Wapakoneta and was truncated at route State Route 117's then-western terminus, and State Route 117 was extended on State Route 116's former eastern heading through Spencerville and all the way to then-State Route 9 (now U.S. Route 127) through Mendon.  In the same year, its concurrency with State Route 32 was ended, and its eastern terminus was moved to Huntsville.  

In 1938, another rerouting moved State Route 117's western terminus to its current terminus.  Its route through Mendon was recertified as State Route 707.

In 1950, State Route 117 was once again routed in a concurrency to Bellefontaine, this time with U.S. Route 33 (which had replaced State Route 32 in 1938).  This concurrency was ended in 1968, and State Route 117 was truncated at its current eastern terminus.

Major intersections

References

117
Transportation in Mercer County, Ohio
Transportation in Van Wert County, Ohio
Transportation in Allen County, Ohio
Transportation in Auglaize County, Ohio
Transportation in Hardin County, Ohio
Transportation in Logan County, Ohio